Tired Eyes Slowly Burning is the debut album of the Canadian band The Tear Garden, released in 1987 through Nettwerk. It is the band's first studio album, preceded by their self-titled EP released a year prior. That EP is appended to the end of Tired Eyes Slowly Burning as tracks 7 to 10.

Critical reception
AllMusic critic Sean Carruthers wrote, "it mixes together to create a dreamy electronic mix that owes something to both Skinny Puppy and The Legendary Pink Dots, but is nonetheless totally different. Think Pink Floyd on a scary electronic acid trip and you're getting close." James Muretich of the Calgary Herald felt the album was more enjoyable than the output of Ka-Spel and Key's respective bands at the time, and said that it "engrosses the senses with its eerie but enticing psychedelic/electronic sound". Tom harrison of The Province likened the album to the work of Pink Floyd and praised the two musicians for leaving their comfort zone to produce an album that he thought was "palpably romantic".

Track listing
All songs written by cEvin Key and Edward Ka-Spel.

Personnel
Personnel adapted from liners notes.

The Tear Garden
Edward Ka-Spel – lyrics, vocals, music
cEvin Key – lyrics, music, engineering, mixing

Additional musicians
Dwayne Goettel – keyboards (1, 2, 3, 5)
Dave Ogilvie – guitar and tapes (1, 5), engineering, mixing
Lee Salford – percussion (2, 5)
Lisa – vocals (4)
Nivek Ogre – vocals (5)

Technical personnel
Steven R. Gilmore – artwork
Greg Sykes – typography

References

1987 albums
The Tear Garden albums
Nettwerk Records albums